Jorge "Popeye" Campillo Hidalgo (born August 10, 1978) is a Mexican former right-handed pitcher.

Career

Atlanta Braves
Campillo was signed as an undrafted free agent by the Atlanta Braves on February 14, .

Seattle Mariners
Campillo was released by the Braves after the 1996 season and signed with a team in the Mexican Pacific League. The Mariners acquired his rights and signed him on March 26, .

He made his major league debut in 2005 with the Seattle Mariners, playing in two games during the season. After leaving a game in 2005 with an injury, Campillo required Tommy John surgery and subsequently missed most of the  season. After rehabbing, Campillo made a rocky first post-surgery appearance with the Mariners in late 2006, after the team purchased his contract from Triple-A Tacoma. He became a free agent after the 2006 season, but was re-signed to a minor league contract by the Mariners.

Campillo played Winter Ball prior to the  season, when he very successfully headlined the Triple-A Tacoma Rainiers' starting rotation. His recovery complete, Campillo led the Pacific Coast League in ERA. After the end of the minor league season, he was recalled to Seattle, where Campillo made several successful appearances out of the Mariner bullpen.

Second Stint with Braves
Campillo became a free agent after the season. On December 17, 2007, Campillo signed with the Atlanta Braves to a minor league contract with an invitation to spring training.

Campillo did not make the  opening day roster but soon received a callup on April 10. He made his Braves debut on April 13 in a relief appearance against the Washington Nationals. Campillo made his first start as an Atlanta Brave on May 20, 2008. He pitched 6 innings and was credited with a win.

On October 12, 2009, the Atlanta Braves outrighted him to the Gwinnett Braves and he elected free agency.

Kansas City Royals
On November 20, 2009, Campillo signed a minor-league contract with the Kansas City Royals.

Tigres de Quintana Roo
Since earlier 2011 he became Tigre de Quintana Roo, a Triple A team in the Mexican League. And they won the championship.

References

External links

1978 births
Living people
Arizona League Mariners players
Atlanta Braves players
Baseball players at the 2007 Pan American Games
Baseball players from Baja California
Gwinnett Braves players
Inland Empire 66ers of San Bernardino players
Major League Baseball pitchers
Major League Baseball players from Mexico
Mexican expatriate baseball players in the United States
Mexican League baseball pitchers
Mississippi Braves players
Omaha Royals players
Pan American Games bronze medalists for Mexico
Pan American Games medalists in baseball
Sportspeople from Tijuana
Richmond Braves players
San Antonio Missions players
Seattle Mariners players
Tacoma Rainiers players
Tigres del México players
Tigres de la Angelopolis players
Tigres de Quintana Roo players
2009 World Baseball Classic players
Medalists at the 2007 Pan American Games